A Slipping-Down Life is a 1970 novel by Anne Tyler.

Plot summary
Evie Decker is a shy, slightly plump teenager, lonely and silent. But her quiet life is shattered when she hears the voice of Drumstrings Casey on the radio and becomes instantly attracted to him. She manages to meet him, bursting out of her lonely shell—and into the attentive gaze of the intangible man who becomes all too real....

Reviews

See also
 A Slipping-Down Life, the novel's film adaptation

References

External links
IMDb A Slipping-Down Life (1999) Film

1970 American novels
Novels by Anne Tyler
American novels adapted into films